McAllister Pender Lonnon (20 April 1916 – 28 January 1999) was an English rower  who competed at the 1936 Summer Olympics.

Lonnon was educated at Westminster School and Cambridge University. In 1935 and 1936 he was a member of the winning Cambridge boat in the Boat Race.  Later in the year he was a member of the crew of  the eight which came fourth representing  Great Britain at the 1936 Summer Olympics in Berlin. He again rowed for Cambridge in the Boat Race in 1937.

See also
List of Cambridge University Boat Race crews

References

1916 births
1999 deaths
People educated at Westminster School, London
English male rowers
British male rowers
Olympic rowers of Great Britain
Rowers at the 1936 Summer Olympics
Cambridge University Boat Club rowers